Challo Driver is Hindi movie released on 20 July 2012, produced by Ronicka Kandhari and starring Kainaz Motivala, Vickrant Mahajan, Prem Chopra, Manoj Pahwa, Tariq Vasudeva, Juhi Pande and Silky Khanna.

Plot
The film stars Prem Chopra as Arjun Kapoor's (Vickrant Mahajan) grandfather. He (Prem) wants someone to come in his grandson's life who would change his life completely. Arjun is very strict by nature and changes his driver five times a month. So by this behaviour of his Prem becomes upset. But suddenly a female driver Tanya (Kainaz Motivala) comes into his life and the whole story changes respectively. At last Arjun marries the female driver and the story ends successfully.

Cast

Soundtrack

Reception
The movie got overall average reviews with Times of India reviewer Madhureeta Mukherjee giving it two stars.

References

External links
 

2012 films
2010s Hindi-language films